The 1954 Wimbledon Championships took place on the outdoor grass courts at the All England Lawn Tennis and Croquet Club in Wimbledon, London, United Kingdom. The tournament was held from Monday 21 June until Saturday 3 July 1954. It was the 68th staging of the Wimbledon Championships, and the third Grand Slam tennis event of 1954. Jaroslav Drobný and Maureen Connolly won the singles titles.

Finals

Seniors

Men's singles

 Jaroslav Drobný defeated  Ken Rosewall, 13–11, 4–6, 6–2, 9–7

Women's singles

 Maureen Connolly defeated  Louise Brough, 6–2, 7–5

Men's doubles

 Rex Hartwig /  Mervyn Rose defeated  Vic Seixas /  Tony Trabert, 6–4, 6–4, 3–6, 6–4

Women's doubles

 Louise Brough /  Margaret duPont defeated  Shirley Fry /  Doris Hart, 4–6, 9–7, 6–3

Mixed doubles

 Vic Seixas /  Doris Hart defeated  Ken Rosewall /  Margaret duPont, 5–7, 6–4, 6–3

Juniors

Boys' singles

 Ramanathan Krishnan defeated  Ashley Cooper, 6–2, 7–5

Girls' singles

 Valerie Pitt defeated  Colette Monnot, 5–7, 6–3, 6–2

References

External links
 Official Wimbledon Championships website

 
Wimbledon Championships
Wimbledon Championships
Wimbledon Championships
Wimbledon Championships